"Insieme a te non ci sto più" (i.e. "I will no longer be with you.") is an Italian pop song written by Paolo Conte, Michele Virano and Vito Pallavicini and performed by Caterina Caselli. Years later Conte revealed that he and Pallavicini auditioned many singers before giving the song to Caselli, as she was the only one who could deliver a strong enough performance.
 
The song peaked at the third place on the Italian hit parade. It was covered by several artists, including  Ornella Vanoni, Franco Battiato, Rita Pavone, Giusy Ferreri, Gianna Nannini, Elisa, Claudio Baglioni, Alessandro Haber, Avion Travel. It was also included in the soundtrack of a number of films, notably Nanni Moretti's Bianca and The Son's Room and Giovanni Veronesi's Manual of Love.

In 2006, Caselli recorded a new version of the song for the soundtrack of the Michele Soavi's neo-noir film The Goodbye Kiss. This version won the David di Donatello Award for Best Song.

Track listing
7" single – AN 4155 
A. "Insieme a te non ci sto più" (Paolo Conte, Michele Virano, Vito Pallavicini) – 2:48
B. "Il dolce volo" (Paolo Conte, Vito Pallavicini) – 2:45

Charts

References

 

1968 singles
1968 songs
Caterina Caselli songs
Songs with lyrics by Vito Pallavicini
Compagnia Generale del Disco singles
Songs with music by Paolo Conte